Caladenia denticulata subsp. rubella, commonly known as the clumped spider orchid, is a plant in the orchid family Orchidaceae and is endemic to the south-west of Western Australia. It has a single erect, hairy leaf and one or two dull or pinkish red flowers with prominent dull red markings and with a white labellum with red markings.

Description
It is usually dull- to pinkish red, sometimes cream or yellow with prominent dull red markings. The arching lateral sepals and petals are similar in size, shape and colour to the dorsal sepal although the petals are slightly narrower and shorter. The labellum is white with red markings, and curves forward with white to pale red teeth along its margins, the teeth decreasing in size towards the tip. There are up to 13 pairs of anvil-shaped, cream-coloured calli in two rows along about half the length of the labellum and decreasing in size towards the tip. Flowering occurs from August to late September. The dull red or pinkish red colour of the petals and sepals distinguish this from the other subspecies of Caladenia denticulata.

Taxonomy and naming
Caladenia denticulata was first formally described by John Lindley in 1840 and the description was published in A Sketch of the Vegetation of the Swan River Colony. In 2015, Andrew Brown and Garry Brockman described three subspecies, including subspecies rubella and the descriptions were published in Nuytsia. The specific epithet (rubella) is a diminutive form of the Latin word ruber meaning "red", hence "reddish", referring to the colour of the flowers of this subspecies.

Distribution and habitat
Clumped spider orchid occurs near Waroona, Kojonup and Watheroo in the Avon Wheatbelt, Geraldton Sandplains, Jarrah Forest, Swan Coastal Plain biogeographic regions growing in moist soils.

Conservation
Caladenia denticulata subsp. rubella  is classified as "not threatened" by the Western Australian Government Department of Parks and Wildlife.

References

denticulata
Endemic orchids of Australia
Orchids of Western Australia
Plants described in 2015